"Trouble Is My Middle Name" is a song written by Neval Nader and John Gluck Jr, and released by Bobby Vinton in 1962. It spent nine weeks on the Billboard Hot 100 chart, peaking at No. 33, while reaching No. 27 on the United Kingdom's New Musical Express chart, and No. 7 on Billboard's Middle-Road Singles chart.

A cover version was released by The Brook Brothers in 1963, which reached No. 38 on the United Kingdom's Record Retailer chart, while a version released in 1966 by The Four Pennies reached No. 32 on the Record Retailer chart.

References

1962 songs
1962 singles
Bobby Vinton songs
Epic Records singles